The Akaflieg München Mü4 München is a glider that was designed and built in Germany in 1927.

Development 
As the membership of Akaflieg München expanded a requirement for more glider training capacity emerged. To provide the extra capacity, students at the Akaflieg designed and built the Mü4 München, ensuring that the aircraft had trouble-free handling and was easy to maintain and repair. Despite the simple gliders low performance it was found that the Mü4 München was capable of soaring flight and so was used for mountain flying in the Alps near Rosenheim.

Specifications (Mü4 München)

References

1920s German sailplanes
Mu04
Aircraft first flown in 1927